The Senapati district of Manipur state in India has 7 subdivisions. At the time of the 2011 Census of India, the present-day Kangpokpi district (split in 2016) was a part of the Senapati district.

Blocks 

The Senapati district has 7 subdivisions or Tribal Development (T.D.) blocks:

 Willong
 Mao Maram
 Chillivai Phaibung
 Song Song
 Lairouching
 Paomata
 Purul

At the time of the 2011 census, the villages in the present-day district were organized into the following three subdivisions; three other subdivisions were split into the Kangpokpi district in 2016.

Villages 

Following is a list of the villages as per the 2011 census:

Mao-Maram block

Paomata block

Purul block

References 

Senapati